Ramón Carande Thovar (May 4, 1887 - September 1, 1986) was a Spanish historian.

Bibliography 
  Spanish translation of Los principios filosóficos de la historia del derecho (1909, Pierre de Tourtoulon).
  Spanish translation of  Los fundamentos teóricos del marxismo (1914, Mikhail Ivanovitch de Tougan-Baranouskii). 
 The Bank of England cumple 252 años S/l, March 1946 (1946).
 La hacienda real de Castilla (1949).
 Larguezas de las Cortes (1518-1555) (1947).
 El crédito de Castilla y el precio de la política imperial (1949).
 Gobernantes y gobernados en la Hacienda de Castilla (1951). 
 El Obispo, el Concejo y los Regidores de Palencia (1932).
 La economía y la expansión de España bajo el Gobierno de los Reyes Católicos (1952).
 La huella económica de las capitales hispano-musulmanas (1949). 
 Carlos V y sus Banqueros, Barcelona : Crítica; Valladolid : Junta de Castilla y León (1987).

1887 births
1986 deaths
20th-century Spanish historians